Lakhish or Lachish may refer to:

Lachish, a biblical city in Israel
Lakhish, Israel, a moshav in south-central Israel
Lakhish Regional Council, a regional council in south-central Israel
Lakhish River, a river in the area
Hevel Lakhish, a region of south-central Israel